Kurmi is a rural locality (a selo) in Gergebilsky District, Republic of Dagestan, Russia. The population was 1,510 as of 2010. There are 14 streets.

Geography 
Kurmi is located 5 km southwest of Gergebil (the district's administrative centre) by road, on the right bank of the Karakoysu River. Khvartikuni and Murada are the nearest rural localities.

References 

Rural localities in Gergebilsky District